The 2021 Just World Indoor Bowls Championship took place at Potters Leisure Resort, Hopton-on-Sea, Great Yarmouth, England, from 8–24 January 2021. The event was organised by the World Bowls Tour, televised by the BBC and streamed live on YouTube. The event was played behind closed doors and there was no under-25 competition due to the COVID-19 pandemic. As a consequence of the pandemic there were no overseas players involved.

A fairer system was devised in the Open pairs whereby all competitors would face a first round match and there would be no byes.

Late changes had to be made to the draw, with world number one and 2nd seed Nick Brett unable to participate because he broke his arm following an accident playing golf. Scottish 11th seed Darren Burnett also pulled out through injury, while Colin Walker, Ian Honnor and Caroline Brown withdrew for personal reasons. Brown was replaced by Rebecca Willgress. This also meant Darren Weir, Julie Forrest, Katherine Rednall and Ellen Falkner were added to the Open Singles field, with Weir, Rednall, Falkner and Devon Cooper being added into the Open Pairs.

In the Men's Singles, the quarter final match between Perry Martin and Wayne Willgress was declared void following a positive COVID-19 test for both players. As a result Mark Dawes (who was due to play the winner in the semi finals) received a walkover into the final. The other finalist was Greg Harlow who was a comfortable winner over David Gourlay in the only semi final. In the final Dawes controlled the match and won 10-3 11-5 to claim his second singles title.

In the Women's Singles, Laura Daniels claimed her second title success by beating Katherine Rednall in a repeat of the 2015 final in which the Welshwoman also won. Rednall, seven months pregnant, had to compete just minutes after beating Alex Marshall in the second round of the Open Singles. Earlier in the competition, Ellen Falkner had to withdraw from her first round match with Rednall due to a shoulder injury. Defending champion Julie Forrest went out in the first round, beaten by Devon Cooper.

In the Open Pairs, Ellen Falkner partnered by Greg Harlow (the defending champion) became the first woman in the competition's history to reach an open final where they met 2018 champions Mark Dawes & Jamie Chestney. Harlow and Falkner won a tight first set 7-6 with Harlow consistently drawing to win an end. Dawes playing a strong lead helped secure a comfortable second set 9-2, sending the match into a tie break. Dawes and Chestney won the tie break 2-1.

In the Mixed Pairs final Stewart Anderson and Julie Forrest defeated Robert Paxton and Carla Banks.

Winners

Draw and results

Open Singles

+ Paxton conceded

Women's singles

Open Pairs

Mixed pairs

References

World Indoor Bowls Championship
2021 in bowls
World Indoor Bowls Championship
International sports competitions hosted by England
World Indoor Bowls Championship
Sport in Great Yarmouth
World Indoor Bowls